Cato Hansen (born 26 May 1988) is a Norwegian football striker.

Career
He came to Brann from Bryne before the 2009 season. At Bryne, he played 45 times, scoring 10 goals in the Norwegian First Division.

On 7 August 2009, Hansen was loaned out to the first division club Løv-Ham for the remainder of the season.

On 29 March 2012, Hansen signed for Sandefjord.

Hansen has also played 8 games for the Norway national under-21 football team.  He is the son of former Norway international footballer Hugo Hansen and his sister, Hege, plays as a striker for the Toppserien club Arna-Bjørnar, as well as being capped for Norway women's national football team.

Career statistics

References

External links
 Profile at brann.no
 Cato Hansen at NFF

1988 births
Living people
People from Bryne
Norwegian footballers
Association football forwards
SK Brann players
Løv-Ham Fotball players
Sogndal Fotball players
Sandefjord Fotball players
Eliteserien players
Sportspeople from Rogaland